The Union County Interscholastic Athletic Conference (UCIAC)  is a New Jersey high school sports association operating under the jurisdiction of the New Jersey State Interscholastic Athletic Association (NJSIAA). The league consists of 26 public and parochial high schools in Union County in central New Jersey.

Schools
Benedictine Academy
David Brearley High School
Abraham Clark High School
Cranford High School
Jonathan Dayton High School
Elizabeth High School
Governor Livingston High School
Hillside High School
Arthur L. Johnson High School
Union County Vocational-Technical High School
Linden High School
Mother Seton Regional High School
New Providence High School
Kent Place School
Oak Knoll School
Oratory Preparatory School
Plainfield High School
Rahway High School
Roselle Catholic High School
Roselle Park High School
St. Mary of the Assumption High School
St. Patrick High School
Scotch Plains-Fanwood High School
Summit High School
Union High School
Union Catholic High School
Westfield High School

External links
New Jersey State Interscholastic Athletic Association
Union County Interscholastic Athletic Conference

New Jersey high school athletic conferences
Sports in Union County, New Jersey